= Adira Mela =

Adira Mela ادیرا میلا
- Location within Pakistan
- Coordinates: 32.57°N 70.01°E
- Country: Pakistan
- Territory: Federally Administered Tribal Areas
- Elevation: 1,376 m (4,514 ft)
- Time zone: UTC+5 (PST)
  - Summer (DST): UTC+6 (PDT)

Adira Mela (Urdu: ادیرا میلا) is a town in the Federally Administered Tribal Areas of Pakistan. It is located at 32°34'21N 70°1'9E with an altitude of 1376 metres (4517 feet).
